An ultra-conserved element (UCE) was originally defined as a genome segment longer than 200 base pairs (bp) that is absolutely conserved, with no insertions or deletions and 100% identity, between orthologous regions of the human, rat, and mouse genomes.
481 ultra-conserved elements have been identified in the human genome. If ribosomal DNA (rDNA regions) are excluded, these range in size from 200 bp to 781 bp. UCRs are found on all chromosomes except for 21 and Y. A database collecting genomic information about ultra-conserved elements (UCbase) is available at http://ucbase.unimore.it. 

Since its creation, this term's usage has broadened to include more evolutionary distant species or shorter segments, for example 100 bp instead of 200 bp. By some definitions, segments need not be syntetic between species. Human UCEs also show high conservation with more evolutionarily distant species, such as chicken and fugu. Out of 481 identified human UCEs, approximately 97% align with high identity to the chicken genome, though only 4% of human genome can only be reliably aligned to the chicken genome. Similarly, the same sequences in the fugu genome have 68% identity to human UCEs, despite the human genome only reliably aligning to 1.8% of the fugu genome. Despite often being noncoding DNA, some ultra-conserved elements have been found to be transcriptionally active, producing non-coding RNA molecules.

Evolution
Researchers originally assumed that perfect conservation of these long stretches of DNA implied evolutionary importance, as these regions appear to have experienced strong negative (purifying) selection for 300-400 million years. More recently, this assumption has been replaced by two main hypotheses: that UCEs are created through a reduced negative selection rate, or through reduced mutation rates, also known as a “cold spot” of evolution.  Many studies have examined the validity of each hypothesis. The probability of finding ultra-conserved elements by chance (under neutral evolution) has been estimated at less than 10−22 in 2.9 billion bases. In support of the cold spot hypothesis, UCEs were found to be mutating 20 fold less than expected under conservative models for neutral mutation rates. This fold change difference in mutation rates was consistent between humans, chimpanzees, and chickens. Ultra-conserved elements are not exempt from mutations, as exemplified by the presence of 29,983 polymorphisms in the UCE regions of the human genome assembly GRCh38. However, affected phenotypes were only caused by 112 of these polymorphisms, most of which were located in coding regions of the UCEs. A study performed in mice determined that deleting UCEs from the genome did not create obvious deleterious phenotypes, despite deletion of UCEs in proximity to promoters and protein coding genes. Affected mice were fertile and targeted screens of the nearby coding genes showed no altered phenotype. A separate mouse study demonstrated that ultra-conserved enhancers were robust to mutagenesis, concluding that perfect conservation of UCE sequences is not required for their function, which would suggest another reason for the sequence consistency besides evolutionary importance. Computational analysis of human ultra-conserved noncoding elements (UCNEs) found that the regions are enriched for A-T sequences and are generally GC poor. However, the UNCEs were found to be enriched for CpG, or highly methylated. This may indicate that there is some change to DNA structure in these regions favoring their precise retention, but this possibility has not been validated through testing.

Function
Often, ultra-conserved elements are located near transcriptional regulators or developmental genes performing functions such as gene enhancing and splicing regulation. A study comparing ultra-conserved elements between humans and the Japanese puffer fish Takifugu rubripes proposed an importance in vertebrate development. Double-knockouts of UCEs near the ARX gene in mice caused a shrunken hippocampus in the brain, though the effect was not lethal. Some UCEs are not transcribed, and are referred to as ultra-conserved noncoding elements. However, many UCRs in humans are extensively transcribed. A small number of those which are transcribed, known as transcribed UTRs (T-UTRs), have been connected with human carcinomas and leukemias. For example, TUC338 is strongly upregulated in human hepatocellular carcinoma cells. Indeed, UCEs are often affected by copy number variation in cancer cells much more than in healthy contexts, suggesting that altering the copy number of T-UCEs may be deleterious.

Role in Human Disease 
Research has demonstrated that T-UCRs have a tissue-specific expression, and a differential expression profile between tumors and other diseases. The tables below highlight transcripts and polymorphisms within UCRs that have been shown to contribute to human diseases. For example, UCRs tend to accumulate less mutations than flanking segments, in both neoplastic and non-neoplastic samples from persons with hereditary non-polyposis colorectal cancer.

Regulation Mechanisms of Disease Related Ultra-conserved Element Transcripts

Phenotype-Associated Polymorphisms within Ultra-conserved Elements

See also 
Human accelerated regions
Synteny

References 

DNA